Constitution Park may refer to a park or location in the United States:

 Constitution Park (Delaware), a park in Dover, Delaware
 Constitution Park (Maryland), a public park in Cumberland
 Constitution Park (New Hampshire), a hotel proposed in 2005 in New Hampshire in response to legal rulings around the concept of eminent domain